Malal Ndiaye (born 12 January 1977 in Dakar) is a Senegalese freestyle wrestler. He competed in the freestyle 120 kg event at the 2012 Summer Olympics and was eliminated by Jargalsaikhany Chuluunbat in the 1/8 finals.

References

External links
 

1977 births
Living people
Senegalese male sport wrestlers
Olympic wrestlers of Senegal
Wrestlers at the 2012 Summer Olympics
Sportspeople from Dakar
20th-century Senegalese people
21st-century Senegalese people